The International Convention Centre (ICC) is a major conference venue in Birmingham, England. The centre incorporates Symphony Hall and faces Centenary Square, with another entrance leading to the canals of Birmingham. The Westside area, which includes Brindleyplace, is opposite the building on the other side of the canal. The centre is owned and operated by the NEC Group, who is also responsible for the nearby Arena Birmingham, just to the west of the complex.

History and construction
The building was designed by Percy Thomas Partnership and Renton Howard Wood Levin. The foundation stone was laid by Jacques Delors as a start of another 4 years and 5 months of construction. In all, over 1,500 workers helped construct the building. Over 60,000 cubic metres of concrete were used. The site was opened on 12 June 1991 by Queen Elizabeth II. Funds of £49.7 million were provided by the European Council. The total cost of construction was £200 million.

It is on the site of the Prince of Wales Theatre and Bingley Hall, the world's first purpose-built exhibition hall, opened in 1850. Also on the site were numerous houses fronting King Edward's Place as well as a brewery and inn. On the eastern side of this was King Alfreds Place which was also fronted by houses and a hotel. A listed Victorian cast iron urinal was removed before construction began, on condition that it be re-erected. Although it was taken to Tyseley Locomotive Works, it has never been restored.

The ICC hosted the 24th G8 summit in May 1998.

On a specified date in August, the building is used by companies, organisations and/ or individuals as part of "Discovery Day" which features events co-ordinated all over the city. In 2004, an area was used as an indoor country fair. The fair featured a Ferris wheel and small rides. In spring 2008, the hall hosted its first-party political conference, for the Labour Party. The venue has since hosted party conferences for all three main political parties over successive years.

Architecture

The façade of the building is covered in blue-tinted windows and white stone cladding. The entrance is adorned by a neon sculpture, by Ron Hasledon, named "Birdlife" which hangs above it. The entrance is used as a small performance area and small protests are sometimes held there. The south side of the building features a link bridge to the Hyatt Regency Hotel. When the pre-fabricated connecting bridge was delivered, it was found to be too short, as the plans for the hotel had been modified, moving it away from the ICC slightly, but the bridge makers had not been informed.

Inside the building, numerous connecting bridges and walkways line the atrium overhead connecting the ten halls and ten additional meeting rooms. The ICC has a total capacity of 8,000 delegates. The largest hall, Hall 3, can hold up to 3,000 delegates when fully using its 3,050m2 space.

Within the mall, there are a number of concessions, including a branch of Castle Fine Art which sells original paintings and prints, a WHSmith store, coffee shops including a Starbucks store as well as the box office for tickets for both Symphony Hall and other local theatres. Hotdesking space is also available with computers providing internet access.

References

External links

1890 map of location of ICC (Bingley Hall is on the far right of image)

Buildings and structures in Birmingham, West Midlands
Exhibition and conference centres in England
Buildings and structures completed in 1991
Centenary Square, Birmingham
Percy Thomas buildings